Soualem is a town in Berrechid Province, Casablanca-Settat, Morocco. In the 2014 Moroccan census the commune recorded a population of 33,079 people living in 7970 households. According to the 2004 census it had a population of 3,243.

References

Populated places in Berrechid Province
Rural communes of Casablanca-Settat